Quebradas Back Country Byway is both a State (July 31, 1998) and National (June 20, 1989) scenic byway, in Socorro County, New Mexico, United States. It is managed by the Bureau of Land Management.

Route 

With a length of about 24 miles, the Quebradas Back Country Byway can be picked up in the north of southwestern New Mexico, near I-25, close to Socorro at the Escondida Exit. The byway stretches over to the east and then down to U.S. 380 in the south. Outdoor enthusiasts enjoy a variety of activities along the byway including hiking, photography, ATVing, rockhounding, and biking.

Features 

Other features include badlands, fossils, rhombohedral calcite crystals, malachite, azurite and more.

See also 
 List of Bureau of Land Management Back Country Byways
 List of New Mexico Scenic and Historic Byways
 Socorro, New Mexico

References

Further reading 
 
 
 
 

Scenic byways in New Mexico
New Mexico Scenic and Historic Byways
Bureau of Land Management Back Country Byways
Tourist attractions in Socorro County, New Mexico